The Causal Angel is the third science fiction novel by Hannu Rajaniemi featuring the protagonist Jean le Flambeur. It was published in July 2014 by Gollancz in the UK and by Tor in the US. The novel is the finale of a trilogy. The previous novels in the series are The Quantum Thief (2010) and The Fractal Prince (2012).

Synopsis
After the events of The Fractal Prince, Jean le Flambeur and Mieli are separated and their sentient spacecraft Perhonen is destroyed. The two protagonists, each in their own way, struggle to decide where their loyalties lie and how to proceed in the catastrophically altered situation. Meanwhile, the Solar System is plummeting into an all-out war of unprecedented scale and consequence. The most powerful factions, the Sobornost and the Zoku, are gathering their forces and making their plays, while simultaneously being torn apart by internal strifes.

See also
 List of characters in the Jean le Flambeur series

References

External links
 
Glossary for The Quantum Thief / The Fractal Prince / Jean le Flambeur, replacing the deleted Wikipedia glossary

2014 American novels
Novels by Hannu Rajaniemi
2014 science fiction novels
Fiction about the Solar System
Quantum fiction novels
Finnish science fiction novels
Artificial intelligence in fiction
Fiction about consciousness transfer
Nanotechnology in fiction
Fiction about megastructures
Exploratory engineering
Victor Gollancz Ltd books
Tor Books books